Shengjingornis is a genus of enantiornithean bird known from the Early Cretaceous of Jinzhou, western Liaoning, China. Its remains were discovered in Jiufotang Formation deposits, dated to 120 million years ago.

Shengjingornis is considerably larger when compared to other longipterygids; combined with its poorly-preserved skull and bizarre claw and digit anatomy similar to both those of birds of prey and ground birds, its lifestyle is unclear.

References

Enantiornitheans
Fossil taxa described in 2012
Early Cretaceous birds of Asia